Charm is a Burmese comedy television series. It aired on MNTV, on every sunday at 19: 20 for 30 episodes. Season 1 aired from April 10 to July 17, 2016 for 15 episodes and season 2 aired from December 11, 2016 to April 2, 2017 for 15 episodes.

Cast
Bunny Phyoe as Charm
Thein Lin Soe as D Wyne
Phyo Zaw Lin as Nyi Sue
Nan Su Oo as Mone Mone Khet
Htet Htet Htun as Pan Myat Cho
Chit Kyay Hmone as Thwel Lay
Wint Yamone Naing as Pyin Oo Lwin
Than Thar Moe Theint as Yamone Nar
Sue Khet Min as Zaw Zaw Oo
Phyo Ngwe Soe as Wunna Kyaw
Aye Wutyi Thaung as Yadanar
Khay Sett Thwin as Annawar

References

External links

Burmese television series
Myanmar National TV original programming